Tristan Gommendy (born 4 January 1979) is a French professional racing driver who currently competes in the European Le Mans Series with Duqueine Engineering.

Racing career

Early career
Born in Le Chesnay, Yvelines, Gommendy began his professional career in French Formula Three in 2000. He won the prestigious Macau Grand Prix in 2002 and also won the French F3 Championship that year. In 2003 he drove in Eurocup Formula Renault V6 and finished third. He moved to its successor the World Series by Nissan in 2004 and finished 5th and another season in 2005 he finished fourth.

GP2, Champ Car, and Superleague Formula

In 2006 Gommendy drove in the first five rounds GP2 Series for the iSport International team and was on front row for his first race in front of Lewis Hamilton. He finished 20th in points, scoring a pair of fifth places at Circuit de Catalunya

On 8 March 2007 it was announced that Gommendy had been signed to drive for PKV Racing in the 2007 Champ Car season as a teammate to Neel Jani. At Houston and Long Beach, he led several laps before breaking down with few laps to go. Later at Circuit Mont-Tremblant, Gommendy won the pole and track record. He participated in twelve of the first thirteen races and finished 12th in points with a best finish of fourth in his final start at TT Circuit Assen.

With Champ Car merging with IndyCar the following year, resulting in fewer available race seats, Gommendy joined Superleague Formula driving for F.C. Porto, winning a race at ACI Vallelunga Circuit in 2008 and Donington Park in 2009. Gommendy continued in Superleague Formula with other teams and little success until the series shut down mid-way through the 2011 season.

Sports cars
Gommendy made his first 24 Hours of Le Mans start in 2003. His team finished the race for the first time in 2010, driving a Welter Racing LMP2 entry to 8th in class. He competed in the LMP2 class of the 2009 Le Mans Series with Welter Racing.

In 2011 following the dissolution of Superleague Formula, Gommendy was largely out of racing until he appeared in the 2013 24 Hours of Le Mans for Signatech in their LMP2 Alpine A450. The team finished 14th overall and 8th in class. He raced at the LMP2 class 2014 European Le Mans Series for Thiriet by TDS Racing, winning at Silverstone. The Frenchman remained at the team for the 2015 European Le Mans Series, claiming a win at Imola and a second place at Red Bull Ring. For the 2016 European Le Mans Series, the driver switched to Eurasia Motorsport, finishing second at Red Bull Ring.

Jackie Chan DC Racing hired Gommendy to compete at the 2017 FIA World Endurance Championship, again in the LMP2 class. He finished third overall at the 2017 24 Hours of Le Mans.

Return to IndyCar

On September 11, 2017, it was announced that Gommendy would return to American open-wheel racing, making his Indianapolis 500 debut at the 2018 Indianapolis 500, driving for Schmidt Peterson Motorsports in a partnership with former Larrousse F1 team boss Didier Calmels. However, that deal has since fallen through.

Racing record

Career summary

† Ineligible for points.

Complete 24 Hours of Le Mans results

Complete Formula Renault 3.5 Series results 
(key) (Races in bold indicate pole position) (Races in italics indicate fastest lap)

† Driver did not finish the race, but was classified as he completed more than 90% of the race distance.

Complete GP2 Series results
(key) (Races in bold indicate pole position) (Races in italics indicate fastest lap)

American Open-Wheel
(key) (Races in bold indicate pole position)

Champ Car

Superleague Formula

2008-2009
(Races in bold indicate pole position) (Races in italics indicate fastest lap)

2009 Super Final Results
Super Final results in 2009 did not count for points towards the main championship.

2010-2011

Complete European Le Mans Series results
(key) (Races in bold indicate pole position; races in italics indicate fastest lap)

‡ Half points awarded as less than 75% of race distance was completed.

Complete FIA World Endurance Championship results
(key) (Races in bold indicate pole position; races in italics indicate fastest lap)

References

External links
 

1979 births
Living people
People from Le Chesnay
French racing drivers
GP2 Series drivers
Formula Renault V6 Eurocup drivers
Champ Car drivers
French Formula Three Championship drivers
British Formula Three Championship drivers
Superleague Formula drivers
24 Hours of Le Mans drivers
European Le Mans Series drivers
World Series Formula V8 3.5 drivers
FIA World Endurance Championship drivers
Asian Le Mans Series drivers
Sportspeople from Yvelines
ART Grand Prix drivers
Eurasia Motorsport drivers
Graff Racing drivers
TDS Racing drivers
Pons Racing drivers
KV Racing Technology drivers
OAK Racing drivers
Signature Team drivers
ISport International drivers
KTR drivers
Alan Docking Racing drivers
Jota Sport drivers
Nürburgring 24 Hours drivers
Saintéloc Racing drivers